Fursan may refer to:
Fursan, Syria, village in Aleppo governorate, Syria
 Jash (term), or Fursan, a Kurdish term for a collaborator

See also
Al Fursan, the UAE air force aerobatics team